Richard Schultz Schweiker (June 1, 1926 – July 31, 2015) was an American businessman and politician. A member of the Republican Party, he served as the 14th U.S. Secretary of Health and Human Services under President Ronald Reagan from 1981 to 1983. He previously served as a U.S. Representative (1961–1969) and a U.S. Senator (1969–1981) from Pennsylvania. In 1976, Schweiker was Reagan's running mate during his unsuccessful presidential campaign.

Early life 
Schweiker was born in Norristown, Pennsylvania, on June 1, 1926.  He was the son of Malcolm Alderfer Schweiker, Sr. (February 27, 1895 – June 12, 1982) and his wife, the former Blanche R. Schultz (December 17, 1894 – September 1974). His father and his uncle worked in the tiling business for several decades. He was born into a family of Schwenckfelders and was a member of the church himself.

Schweiker received his early education at public schools in Worcester, and graduated from Norristown Area High School as valedictorian in 1944. During World War II, he served in the U.S. Navy aboard the aircraft carrier , being discharged with the rank of electronics technician (second class) in 1946.

Following his military service, Schweiker attended Slippery Rock State College for two years before transferring to Pennsylvania State University. He received a Bachelor of Arts degree in psychology from Penn State in 1950, graduating as a member of the Phi Kappa Sigma. He then joined his family's business, American Olean Tile Company, rising from an assistant in the personnel department to the company's president within a few years. He also became active in local Republican politics, serving as a precinct committeeman, and founded the Montgomery County chapter of the Young Republicans, of which he was president from 1952 to 1954. He was selected as an alternate delegate to the Republican National Convention in 1952 and in 1956.

Marriage and family 
On September 10, 1955, Schweiker married Claire Joan Coleman, a former host of the children's television show Romper Room, in Philadelphia, Pennsylvania (1954–1956). They had two sons and three daughters.

Political career

U.S. House of Representatives
In 1960, Schweiker was elected to the U.S. House of Representatives from Pennsylvania's 13th congressional district. At the time, the Montgomery County-based district included Schweiker's home town of Norristown and several affluent suburban communities in the Philadelphia Main Line. A moderate to liberal Republican, he defeated conservative incumbent John A. Lafore, Jr., in the Republican primary. In the general election, he defeated Democrat Warren Ballard, a law professor at Temple University, 62%–38%. He was elected to three more terms, never receiving less than 59% of the vote.

During his tenure in the House, Schweiker served on the Armed Services Committee and the Government Operations Committee. He sponsored legislation, signed into law in 1965, that provided cash awards to United States Armed Forces personnel for cost-cutting ideas. Schweiker voted for the Civil Rights Acts of 1964 and 1968 and the Voting Rights Act of 1965. He also supported the creation of Medicare, increases in Social Security, and federal rent subsidies. He considered running for governor of Pennsylvania in 1966, but state Republican leaders persuaded him not to in favor of then-Lieutenant Governor Raymond P. Shafer.

U.S. Senate
In 1968, Schweiker was elected to the U.S. Senate, defeating two-term Democratic incumbent Joseph S. Clark, Jr., by more than 280,000 votes. He was the only successful Republican statewide candidate in an election that saw Hubert Humphrey win Pennsylvania by over 170,000 votes. Continuing his progressive reputation in the Senate, Schweiker opposed the Vietnam War and President Richard Nixon's nominations of Clement Haynsworth and G. Harrold Carswell to the U.S. Supreme Court, and had an 89% rating from the liberal Americans for Democratic Action. But he also supported school prayer and opposed stronger widespread gun control.

During his tenure in the Senate, Schweiker served as the ranking member on both the Labor and Human Resources Committee and the Labor, Health, and Human Services Appropriations Subcommittee. He was a pioneer in increasing government spending on diabetes mellitus research, authoring and sponsoring of the National Diabetes Mellitus Research and Education Act. This legislation, passed by Congress in 1974, established the National Commission on Diabetes to create a long-term plan to fight the disease.

Schweiker was reelected in 1974, defeating his Democratic opponent, Pittsburgh mayor Peter F. Flaherty, in a year when many Republican incumbents lost due to political fallout from the Watergate scandal. He won 53% of the vote, the highest of any senator from Pennsylvania since 1946. He was the first Republican senator ever endorsed by the Pennsylvania AFL–CIO, and received 49% of the vote in heavily Democratic Philadelphia.

Church Committee
From 1975 to 1976, Schweiker was a member of the Select Committee to Study Governmental Operations with Respect to Intelligence Activities, headed by Idaho Senator Frank Church, investigating illegal domestic activities of the United States government's intelligence agencies. The "Church Committee" found that allegations of CIA plots to assassinate Cuban Premier Fidel Castro during John F. Kennedy's presidency went unreported to the Warren Commission even though CIA director Allen Dulles was a member of the Commission. These findings led Schweiker to call for a reinvestigation of Kennedy's assassination. Church appointed Schweiker and Colorado Senator Gary Hart to be a two-person subcommittee to look into the "performance or non-performance" of intelligence agencies during the initial investigation of the assassination. In October 1975, Schweiker said at a press conference that the subcommittee had developed "significant leads" and was investigating three conspiracy theories, adding, "I think the Warren Commission is like a house of cards. It's going to collapse." In its final report, the Church Committee called the initial investigation deficient and criticized the response of CIA and FBI, but stated that it had "not uncovered any evidence sufficient to justify a conclusion that there was a conspiracy to assassinate President Kennedy."

On May 14, 1976, Schweiker told CBS Morning News that he believed the CIA and FBI had lied to the Warren Commission. On June 27, 1976, he appeared on CBS's Face the Nation and said that the Commission made a "fatal mistake" by relying on the CIA and FBI instead of its own investigators. Schweiker also said that he felt it was possible that the White House was involved in a cover-up.

Vice Presidential consideration
In 1976, Ronald Reagan made a serious challenge against President Gerald Ford in the 1976 Republican Party presidential primaries. Immediately before the opening of the 1976 Republican National Convention, Reagan attempted to attract moderate delegates by promising to name Schweiker, who had a moderate voting record in the Senate, as his running mate. This was unusual because the tradition was for a nominee to name a running mate only after winning the nomination. In response, conservative Republicans, including U.S. Senator Jesse Helms of North Carolina, encouraged a movement to draft Conservative Party U.S. Senator James L. Buckley of New York as the G.O.P. nominee. Ford won the nomination on the first ballot by a razor-thin margin and selected Bob Dole for vice president.

Reagan's naming him as his running mate came as a surprise to Schweiker, as the two did not know each other. Schweiker subsequently adopted a much more conservative voting record; his rating from the liberal group Americans for Democratic Action dropped to 15% in 1977.

In 1980, Schweiker announced he would not seek reelection to the Senate.  Reagan won the presidential nomination in 1980 but chose George H. W. Bush, not Schweiker, as his running mate, and won the election.

Health secretary

Schweiker accepted President Reagan's appointment as U.S. Secretary of Health and Human Services in January 1981. He held the post until he resigned in February 1983. During his tenure, he worked with Reagan and House Speaker Tip O'Neill to reform Social Security, put greater emphasis on preventive medicine, reduce Medicare and food stamp grants to the states, and restrict welfare eligibility. He proposed reducing Social Security benefits to recipients who retired before age 65, but both Democrats and Republicans in Congress rejected the idea.

Political legacy
During his tenure in public service, Schweiker was an ardent supporter of a volunteer army. He coauthored the book How to End the Draft, eventually used as the blueprint for shifting the country to a fully volunteer army. He also pushed for the Schweiker Act of 1965, which gave cash awards to military personnel who suggested money-saving ideas, ultimately resulting in savings of more than $1 billion to taxpayers.

As ranking Republican on the Senate health subcommittee, Schweiker worked on legislation to combat diabetes, cancer, heart disease, sickle cell anemia, and lead paint poisoning. He focused heavily on diabetes and authored bills creating the National Commission on Diabetes Advisory Board, pushing for passage of the National Diabetes Act in 1972. Those efforts led to increased federal funding for diabetes programs and were a prototype for legislatively constructing a research effort across all National Institutes of Health operations and the Centers for Disease Control. Some who worked with Schweiker or benefited from his initiative called him the "Patron Saint of the Pancreas" for his devotion to the cause.

Later life and death
From 1983 to 1994, Schweiker served as president of the American Council of Life Insurance, now known as the American Council of Life Insurers. He retired and lived in McLean, Virginia.

On July 31, 2015, Schweiker died of complications from an infection at the AtlantiCare Regional Medical Center in Pomona, New Jersey.

See also
Rockefeller Republican
List of Pennsylvania State University people

References

External links

 Retrieved on 2008-03-31

|-

|-

|-

1926 births
2015 deaths
United States Navy personnel of World War II
American people of German descent
American Protestants
Military personnel from Pennsylvania
Pennsylvania State University alumni
People from Norristown, Pennsylvania
Reagan administration cabinet members
Republican Party members of the United States House of Representatives from Pennsylvania
Republican Party United States senators from Pennsylvania
United States Navy non-commissioned officers
United States Secretaries of Health and Human Services
20th-century American politicians